Minuscule 811 (in the Gregory-Aland numbering), ε4005 (von Soden), is a Greek minuscule manuscript of the New Testament written on parchment. Palaeographically it has been assigned to the 13th century.

Description 
The codex contains the text of the four Gospels, on 289 parchment leaves (size ).

The text is written in one column per page, 23 lines per page.

Some parts of the Gospel of Matthew are on paper.

Text 
The Greek text of the codex is a representative of the Byzantine text-type. Aland placed it in Category V.

It was not examined by Hermann von Soden. According to the Claremont Profile Method it has mixed Byzantine text in Luke 1 and represents textual family Kx in Luke 20. In Luke 10 no profile was made. It is related to the textual cluster 1053 in Luke 1.

History 
The manuscript is currently dated by the INTF to the 13th century.

The scribe was Georgios, a priest. The manuscript was found in 1899. It came from Corfu, and was held in Biblical Archaeology Society in Athens.

It was added to the list of New Testament manuscripts by Gregory (811e). Gregory did not see it.

The manuscript is now housed at the library of the National Library of Greece (2814) in Athens.

See also 

 List of New Testament minuscules
 Biblical manuscript
 Textual criticism
 Minuscule 809

References

Further reading

External links 
 Minuscule 811 at the National Library of Greece

Greek New Testament minuscules
13th-century biblical manuscripts
Manuscripts of the National Library of Greece